Foster, California may refer to:
Foster, San Diego County, California
Foster, Siskiyou County, California
Foster Bar, California
Foster City, California